Lee Hsin-han and Peng Hsien-yin were the defending champions but lost to Huang Liang-Chi and Yang Tsung-hua.
Marin Draganja and Mate Pavić won the title over Lee Hsin-han and Peng Hsien-yin 7–5, 6–2.

Seeds

Draw

Draw

References
 Main Draw

Samsung Securities Cup - Doubles
2013 Doubles